The term physical constant expresses the notion of a physical quantity subject to experimental measurement which is independent of the time or location of the experiment. The constancy (immutability) of any "physical constant" is thus subject to experimental verification.

Paul Dirac in 1937 speculated that physical constants such as the gravitational constant or the fine-structure constant might be subject to change over time in proportion of the age of the universe.
Experiments conducted since then have put upper bounds on their time-dependence. This concerns the fine-structure constant, the gravitational constant and the proton-to-electron mass ratio specifically, for all of which there are ongoing efforts to improve tests on their time-dependence.

The immutability of these fundamental constants is an important cornerstone of the laws of physics as currently known; the postulate of the time-independence of physical laws is tied to that of the conservation of energy (Noether theorem), so that the discovery of any variation would imply the discovery of a previously unknown law of force.

In a more philosophical context, the conclusion that these quantities are constant raises the question of why they have the specific value they do in what appears to be a "fine-tuned universe", while their being variable would mean that their known values are merely an accident of the current time at which we happen to measure them.

Dimensionality

It is problematic to discuss the proposed rate of change (or lack thereof) of a single dimensional physical constant in isolation. The reason for this is that the choice of a system of units may arbitrarily select any physical constant as its basis, making the question of which constant is undergoing change an artefact of the choice of units.

For example, in SI units, the speed of light has been given a defined value in 1983. Thus, it was meaningful to experimentally measure the speed of light in SI units prior to 1983, but it is not so now.
Tests on the immutability of physical constants look at dimensionless quantities, i.e. ratios between quantities of like dimensions, in order to escape this problem. Changes in physical constants are not meaningful if they result in an observationally indistinguishable universe. For example, a "change" in the speed of light c would be meaningless if accompanied by a corresponding "change" in the elementary charge e so that the ratio e2:c (the fine-structure constant) remained unchanged.

Natural units are systems of units entirely based in fundamental constants. In such systems, it is meaningful to measure any specific quantity which is not used in the definition of units. The 2019 redefinition of SI base units expresses all SI base units in terms of fundamental physical constants, effectively transforming the SI system into a system of natural units.

Fine-structure constant
In 1999, evidence for time variability of the fine-structure constant based on observation of quasars was announced but a much more precise study based on CH molecules did not find any variation. An upper bound of 10−17 per year for the time variation, based on laboratory measurements, was published in 2008. Observations of a quasar of the universe at only 0.8 billion years old with AI analysis method employed on the Very Large Telescope (VLT) found a spatial variation preferred over a no-variation model at the  level.

The time-variation of fine-structure constant is equivalent to the time-variation of one or more of: speed of light, Planck constant, vacuum permittivity, and elementary charge, since .

Speed of light

Gravitational constant
The gravitational constant  is difficult to measure with precision, and conflicting measurements in the 2000s have inspired the controversial suggestions of a periodic variation of its value in a 2015 paper.

A meaningful test on the time-variation of G would require comparison with a non-gravitational force to obtain a dimensionless quantity, e.g. through the ratio of the gravitational force to the electrostatic force between two electrons, which in turn is related to the dimensionless fine-structure constant.

Proton-to-electron mass ratio
An upper bound of the change in the proton-to-electron mass ratio
has been placed at 10−7 over a period of 7 billion years (or 10−16 per year) in a 2012 study based on the observation of methanol in a distant galaxy.

Cosmological constant

The cosmological constant is a measure of the energy density of the vacuum. It was first measured, and found to have a positive value, in the 1990s. It is currently (as of 2015) estimated at 10−122 in Planck units. Possible variations of the cosmological constant over time or space are not amenable to observation, but it has been noted that, in Planck units, its measured value is suggestively close to the reciprocal of the age of the universe squared, Λ ≈ T−2. Barrow and Shaw proposed a modified theory in which Λ is a field evolving in such a way that its value remains Λ ~ T−2 throughout the history of the universe.

See also
 Dirac large numbers hypothesis

References

Dara Faroughy, "Slowly evolving early universe and a phenomenological model for time-dependent fundamental constants and the leptonic masses" (2008), arXiv:0801.1935.
Jean-Philippe Uzan, "Varying Constants, Gravitation and Cosmology", Living Rev. Relativ., 14.2 (2011).

Physical constants
Fundamental constants
Time in physics